Raja Sandow (born P. K. Nagalingam) was an Indian film actor, film director and producer. He began his career as an actor in silent films and later became a prominent actor and director in Tamil and Hindi films of the 1930s. He is considered to be one of the pioneers of early Indian cinema.

Biography and career
Raja Sandow was born in Pudukottai, Tamil Nadu. He was trained as a gymnast and started his film career as a stunt actor in S.N. Patankar's National Film Company at Bombay. He was given the name "Raja Sandow" because of his physique (after strongman Eugen Sandow). His first lead role was in Patankar's Bhaktha Bhodhana (1922), for which he was paid Rs. 101 as salary. He became famous by starring in silent films like Veer Bhemsen (1923), The Telephone Girl (1926). After acting in a few silent films he also worked as a director in Ranjit Studios for a monthly salary. His first film as director was Sneh Jyoti (1928).

Returning to Tamil Nadu, he directed and acted in a number of silent films for R. Padmanaban's Associate Film Company. Many of his silent films had reformist social themes like Peyum pennum (1930), Nandhanar (1930), Anadhai Penn (1931), Pride of Hindustan (1931) and sathi usha sundari (1931). After talking films were introduced with Alam Ara in 1931, he went back to Bombay and starred in many Hindi and Tamil talkies. He was often paired with the actresses Gohar and Sulochana (Ruby Myers). Between 1932–35, he acted in many socially themed Hindi films like Shyam sundar (1932), Devaki (1934) and Indira MA (1935). In 1935, he was commissioned to direct his first Tamil film Menaka and returned to Madras. He continued directing and acting in films till his death in 1943. Vasantha Sena(1936), Chalak Chor (1936), Chandra kantha (1936), Vishnuleela (1938), Thiruneelakantar (1939) and Choodamani (1941) were some of the films he directed and starred in during that period. The last film he worked in was Sivakavi (1943).
Sandow suffered a heart attack and died at Coimbatore on 25 November 1943. He was survived by his wife Leelabai and one Son.

Legacy

Sandow was the first Tamil film director to adopt the practice of using names of actors in film titles. He was the first to introduce intimate kissing scenes and dancers in revealing costumes to the then conservative Tamil film industry. He was also the first director and producer to move Tamil cinema from remaking mythological stories and into making social themed films. He even advertised his films as "Don't miss to see your own picture". Sandow was also the first director to use Tamil literary works for film by directing Anadhai penn in 1931 based on  Vai. Mu. Kothainayagi Ammal's novel of the same name.

Writing about Sandow, film historian Theodore Baskaran says:

Film historian Randor Guy has also described him as a tough task master:

The Tamil Nadu Government has instituted an annual award in his name called Raja Sandow memorial Award, given for outstanding services to Tamil Cinema. A Postage stamp has been in issued in recognition of his contributions to Indian cinema.

Filmography

References

External links

Film directors from Tamil Nadu
Tamil film directors
Tamil-language film directors
Tamil screenwriters
1890s births
1942 deaths
People from Pudukkottai
Male actors from Tamil Nadu
Indian male silent film actors
Indian silent film directors
20th-century Indian film directors
20th-century Indian male actors
Screenwriters from Tamil Nadu
20th-century Indian screenwriters